Michael John Harrison (18 April 1940 – 27 January 2019) was an English professional footballer who played as a left winger. Harrison made over 250 appearances in the Football League for four clubs over a thirteen-year period.

Career
Born in Ilford, Harrison began his career with the youth team of Chelsea, appearing in the Final of the 1957–58 FA Youth Cup. He made his senior debut in 1957, at the age of 16. He made 61 league appearances for Chelsea, and also played for Blackburn Rovers, Plymouth Argyle and Luton Town, where he made 160, 15 and 31 appearances respectively, before dropping out to play non-league football with Dover Town.

Harrison represented England Schools, and also played for the England under-23 team.

Later life and death
After retiring from football, Harrison worked as an insurance salesman and for a medical company in the West Country.

Harrison died on 27 January 2019, aged 78, at a care home in Spain.

References

1940 births
2019 deaths
English footballers
England under-23 international footballers
Chelsea F.C. players
Blackburn Rovers F.C. players
Plymouth Argyle F.C. players
Luton Town F.C. players
Dover F.C. players
English Football League players
Association football wingers